Sphingonotus corsicus, the Corsican sand grasshopper, is a species of band-winged grasshopper in the family Acrididae. It is found in Corsica and other Mediterranean countries.

The IUCN conservation status of Sphingonotus corsicus is "LC", least concern, with no immediate threat to the species' survival. The IUCN status was assessed in 2015.

References

External links

 

Oedipodinae